Gracilodes nysa is a species of moth in the  family Erebidae.  The species is found in Africa, from Uganda and Kenya to South Africa and on the islands of the Indian Ocean, in Mauritius, Réunion, Madagascar, Seychelles and Comores.

Adults have a dark brown colour and a wingspan of approx. 45 mm.

One of the hostplants of its caterpillars is Vangueria madagascariensis, a Rubiaceae.

References
	

Pangraptinae
Moths described in 1852
Moths of Madagascar
Moths of the Comoros
Moths of Mauritius
Moths of Seychelles
Moths of Réunion
Moths of Sub-Saharan Africa